This is a list of gliders/sailplanes of the world, (this reference lists all gliders with references, where available) 
Note: Any aircraft can glide for a short time, but gliders are designed to glide for longer.

Indian miscellaneous constructors 
 HAL G-1 – Hindustan Aeronautics Limited – India
 Hindustan Ardhra – (CAD ATS-1 Ardhra)
 HAL X-241 (HF-24 glider)

Notes

Further reading

External links

Lists of glider aircraft